Gouville-sur-Mer (literally Gouville on Sea) is a commune in the Manche department in north-western France. On 1 January 2016, the former commune of Boisroger was merged into Gouville-sur-Mer. On 1 January 2019, the former communes of Anneville-sur-Mer, Montsurvent and Servigny were merged into Gouville-sur-Mer.

Heraldry

See also
Communes of the Manche department

References 

Gouvillesurmer
Populated coastal places in France